Okhnebin is a village in Sagaing District in the southeast of the Sagaing Division in Burma.  It is located northwest of the regional city of Sagaing.

Populated places in Sagaing District